Adventures of the Barber of Seville (French: L'aventurier de Séville, Spanish: Aventuras del barbero de Sevilla) is a 1954 French-Spanish comedy film directed by Ladislao Vajda and starring Luis Mariano, Lolita Sevilla and Danielle Godet. It was entered into the 1954 Cannes Film Festival.

Plot 
Figaro, a singing barber, gets caught by some bandits who use his abilities to attract travelers and assault them. To escape justice he joins the army.  Meanwhile, the bandits are all captured where the authorities give them a stark choice - death by garrote or join the army. Both the bandits and Figaro end up serving in the same military company.  They are shipped to Puerto Rico and fight pirates, returning to Spain with acclaim. Now he will know the rich salons and the bright side of life.

Cast

 Luis Mariano as Fígaro
 Lolita Sevilla as Pepilla
 Danielle Godet as Rosina
 José Isbert as Don Faustino
 Emma Penella as Duquesa de San Tirso
 Miguel Gila as Sargento
 Jean Galland as Don Bartolo
 Juan Calvo as El Cartujano
 José María Rodero as Conde de Almaviva
 Fernando Sancho as Sir Albert
 Pierre Cour as Mellao
 Antonio Riquelme as Cabo de alguaciles
 Mariano Asquerino as L'Amiral
 Raúl Cancio as Rubio
 Carmen Sánchez as Doña Rosa
 Joaquín Roa as Bandido novato
 Carlos Díaz de Mendoza as Capitán
 Antonio Padilla as Saltamontes
 José Gómiz as Educao
 Juanita Azores as Señora en la barbería (as Juana Azores)
 Luis Rivera as Señor en la barbería
 Emilio Santiago as Barbero 2º
 Ángel Álvarez as Dueño de la posada

See also
 The Barber of Seville, 1775 play

References

External links

1954 films
1954 musical comedy films
Spanish musical comedy films
French comedy films
1950s Spanish-language films
Films directed by Ladislao Vajda
Films set in Seville
Films set in the 18th century
Films based on The Barber of Seville (play)
Cifesa films
1950s Spanish films
1950s French films